KLAS Motorsports (formerly Jankowiak Motorsports) is an American stock car racing team that currently competes in the ARCA Menards Series, fielding the No. 73 Ford Fusion part-time for Andy Jankowiak, who also owns the team.

ARCA Menards Series

Car No. 73 history 
On February 10, 2021, it was announced that Andy Jankowiak had purchased a car from Ken Schrader Racing and would use it for his own team.

In the week leading up to the season-opening Lucas Oil 200 at Daytona International Speedway, Jankowiak received sponsorship from OneRail. For the race, Jankowiak qualified in 11th place out of 34 cars and would finish on the lead lap in eighth.

He then competed at the General Tire 200 at Talladega Superspeedway, with sponsorship from V1 Fiber and Thermal Foams. Jankowiak started 27th and would improve his finish to seventh, once again on the lead lap.

At the General Tire 150 at Charlotte Motor Speedway, Jankowiak honored, on his car and helmet, members of the United States Armed Forces from western New York that had been killed in action. With sponsorship from V1 again, he started eighth out of 23 cars and would finish in ninth place, on the lead lap.

Prior to the General Tire #AnywhereIsPossible 200 at Pocono Raceway, Jankowiak received sponsorship from Konnect General Stores through their Phillips 66 distribution. In the field of 24 cars, he started in ninth place and would equal his Talladega finish by finishing seventh, Jankowiak's fourth top 10 and lead lap finish of the season.

Jankowiak started his first non-superspeedway oval race when he competed at the road course Watkins Glen International for the Clean Harbors 100 at The Glen. For the race, Marsh Racing collaborated in the fielding of the entry, with continued sponsorship from Konnect via their corporate sibling Dak's Market and Phillips 66. The same car from the oval races was converted to a road course set-up. On his first lap of the combined practice and qualifying session, the rear end on Jankowiak's car blew, causing his team to spend most of the session repairing his car, resulting in them qualifying 27th in the 28 car field. He would finish the race in 16th place, albeit two laps down.

He was also entered in the Bush's Beans 200 and Reese's 150, having finished 26th and 13th, respectively.

In 2022, Whelen Engineering would sponsor Jankowiak starting at the Talladega with technical support from Marsh Racing, although the car will still be a Ford

On January 19, 2023, it was announced that Jankowiak would return to run part-time in the main ARCA Series in 2023, continuing to drive the No. 73 car, but the ownership of his race team would be taken over by fellow driver Andy Seuss as well as Kevin Lapierre, allowing Jankowiak to focus on the driver role. The team was renamed KLAS Motorsports (the initials of the two new owners).

Car No. 73 results

References

Stock car racing